Luis de Almeida can refer to:

 Luis de Almeida (missionary), Portuguese missionary credited for establishing the first European hospital in Japan
 Luís de Almeida (diplomat), Angolan diplomat
 Luis de Almeida, 1st Count of Avintes, Portuguese nobleman, governor of Rio de Janeiro and Tangier